Albert Frederick (7 May 1553 – 27 August 1618) was the Duke of Prussia, from 1568 until his death.  He was a son of Albert of Prussia and Anna Marie of Brunswick-Lüneburg. He was the second and last Prussian duke of the Ansbach branch of the Hohenzollern family.

Duke of Prussia
Albert became Duke of Prussia after paying feudal homage to his cousin, the King of Poland, Zygmunt August, on 19 July 1569 in Lublin.  The homage was described by the Polish chronicler Jan Kochanowski in his work Proporzec ("Standard"). During the 1573 Polish election, Albert Frederick attempted to gain acceptance to the Polish senate but was opposed by the powerful Jan Zamoyski (later Grand Hetman of the Crown of the Kingdom of Poland) who feared the influence of Protestants in the Polish legislative body. Albert Frederick initially refused to recognize the election of Stefan Bathory and supported the candidacy of Maximilian of Habsburg. However, at the Toruń sejm of October 1576 he gave his support to the new monarch.

As the great grandson of the Polish king Casimir IV Jagiellon, and as a Duke in Prussia who was fluent in Polish, Albert Frederick was seriously considered for a time as a possible candidate for the Polish throne. He particularly enjoyed the support of Polish Lutherans.

In 1572 he began to exhibit signs of mental disorder. In early 1578, the regency was taken over by his cousin, George Frederick of Brandenburg-Kulmbach (1539–1603). After George Frederick's death in 1603, the Polish king Sigismund III Vasa appointed Joachim Frederick as regent in 1605, and permitted his son, John Sigismund, to succeed him in 1611. The latter became Duke of Prussia after Albert Frederick's death in 1618.

Marriage
Albert Frederick was married in 1573 to Marie Eleonore of Cleves, a daughter of Wilhelm, Duke of Jülich-Cleves-Berg and Archduchess Maria of Austria (1531–1581). Maria was a daughter of Ferdinand I, Holy Roman Emperor and Anna of Bohemia and Hungary.

Issue
Albert Frederick and Marie were parents to seven children:
 Anna of Prussia (3 July 1576 – 30 August 1625). Married John Sigismund, Elector of Brandenburg.
 Marie of Prussia (23 January 1579 – 21 February 1649). Married Christian, Margrave of Brandenburg-Bayreuth.
 Albert Frederick of Prussia (1 June 1580 – 8 October 1580).
 Sophie of Prussia (31 March 1582 – 4 December 1610). Married Wilhelm Kettler of Courland.
 Eleanor of Prussia (21 August 1583 – 9 April 1607). Married Joachim Frederick, Elector of Brandenburg.
 Wilhelm Frederick of Prussia (23 June 1585 – 18 January 1586).
 Magdalene Sibylle of Prussia (31 December 1586 – 22 February 1659). Married John George I, Elector of Saxony.

At his death, the duchy passed to his son-in-law John Sigismund, Margrave of Brandenburg, combining the two territories under a single dynasty and forming Brandenburg-Prussia.

Ancestors

References

External links 

 Albert Frederick profile in the Neue Deutsche Biographie.
 Albert Frederick profile in the Allgemeine Deutsche Biographie.

 
 

1553 births
1618 deaths
16th-century Dukes of Prussia
17th-century Dukes of Prussia
House of Hohenzollern
People from the Duchy of Prussia
Nobility from Königsberg
Protestant monarchs
Duchy of Prussia